The1982 Newham London Borough Council election for the Newham London Borough Council was held on 6 May 1982. The whole council was up for election. Turnout was 27.0%. The Labour Party held onto its overwhelming majority.

Election result

|}

Background
A total of 156 candidates stood in the election for the 60 seats being contested across 24 wards. Candidates included a full slate from the Labour Party, whilst the Conservative Party ran 29 candidates. The Liberal and SDP parties ran 56 joint candidates whilst the Liberal Party also ran 3 candidates under the Liberal Focus Team Alliance banner. Other candidates included 5 Independents, 1 Communist and 3 National Front.

Results by ward

Beckton

Bemersyde

Canning Town & Grange

Castle

Central

Custom House & Silvertown

Forest Gate

Greatfield

Hudsons

Kensington

Little Ilford

Manor Park

Monega

New Town

Ordnance

Park

Plaistow

Plashet

St Stephens

South

Stratford

Upton

Wall End

West Ham

By-elections between 1982 and 1986

Forest Gate

The by-election was called following the resignation of Cllr. Michael T. Foley.

Little Ilford

The by-election was called following the resignations of Cllr. Rif Winfield and Cllr. Ann Winfield.

New Town

The by-election was called following the resignation of Cllr. Maurice Sampson.

References

1982
1982 London Borough council elections
May 1982 events in the United Kingdom